Lynch Public Schools was a school district in Nebraska. Its sole school was Lynch Public School, a pre-K-12 school in Lynch. The district territory included Lynch, Bristow, and Monowi. The Lynch district consolidated into the Boyd County Schools district in June 2017 since enrollment in area schools had decreased.

When it existed, it often had almost each 30 students at the elementary level, 15 at the middle school level, and 25 at the high school level.

References

External links

 

School districts in Nebraska
Education in Boyd County, Nebraska
Former school districts in the United States
2017 disestablishments in Nebraska
Educational institutions disestablished in 2017